Ralph is an unincorporated community in Tuscaloosa County, Alabama, United States. Ralph has a post office with ZIP code 35480, which opened on March 3, 1900. Ralph was originally known as Hickman, in honor of the first postmaster, William P. Hickman. In 1900, the name was changed to Ralph, either for Ralph Stewart, the son of the postmaster at the time, or Kathleen Ralf Stewart, the wife of said postmaster.

Notable people
Larry Gene Bell (1949-1996), murderer and suspected serial killer; born in Ralph
Lillie Leatherwood (born 1964), athlete; raised in Ralph
 Walter Roland (1902 or 1903-1972), American blues, boogie-woogie and jazz pianist, guitarist and singer; born in Ralph

References

Unincorporated communities in Tuscaloosa County, Alabama
Unincorporated communities in Alabama